Edwin Baker (born June 1, 1991) is a former American football running back. He was drafted by the San Diego Chargers in the seventh round of the 2012 NFL Draft. He played college football at Michigan State.

Professional career

San Diego Chargers
Baker was selected in the seventh round of the 2012 NFL Draft by the San Diego Chargers. On August 25, 2013, he was cut by the Chargers.

Cleveland Browns
On December 10, 2013, the Cleveland Browns signed Baker to their active roster, off of the Houston Texans practice squad. In his debut, on December 15, 2013 against the Chicago Bears, Baker scored his first touchdown in the NFL on a short run. The Browns still lost 38-31. In just three games with Cleveland, Baker finished in 3rd in rushing yards and tied for the team lead in rushing touchdowns with two. On August 25, 2014, Baker was cut by the Browns.

New Orleans Saints
Baker was signed to the New Orleans Saints practice squad on September 16, 2014.  He was moved to the active roster on October 25, 2014 after injuries to two other running backs, Pierre Thomas and Khiry Robinson. He was released by the Saints on September 5, 2015.

Toronto Argonauts
Baker signed with the Toronto Argonauts on January 19, 2016. On June 19, 2016, Baker was released by Toronto.

References

External links
Michigan State Spartans bio
New Orleans Saints bio

1991 births
Living people
American football running backs
Canadian football running backs
African-American players of American football
African-American players of Canadian football
Michigan State Spartans football players
San Diego Chargers players
Denver Broncos players
Houston Texans players
Cleveland Browns players
New Orleans Saints players
Toronto Argonauts players
People from Highland Park, Michigan
Players of American football from Michigan
21st-century African-American sportspeople